Lophoptera longipennis is a moth of the family Noctuidae first described by Frederic Moore in 1882. It is found in the India's north-eastern Himalayas, Taiwan, Sumatra, Java and Borneo.

References

Moths described in 1882
Stictopterinae
Moths of Asia